The rise of Nazism and its aftermath led to a wave of Central European intellectuals, many of them Jewish, seeking escape abroad during the 1930s and 1940s due to persecution at home. It has been claimed that nearly 70 composers came to the UK to escape Nazi persecution between 1933 and 1945, though many of them subsequently moved on elsewhere. This list details those composers, performers, publishers and musicologists who ended up living and working in Britain, where they had a significant and lasting influence on musical culture and development.

Primarily composers
 Boaz Bischofswerder (1885-1946). Arrived in 1933 from Germany. Deported as an enemy alien to Australia in 1940 with his son Felix Werder
 Nicholas Brodszky (1905-1958). Arrived from Austria 1939, moved on to California 1949
 Francis Chagrin (1905-1972). Arrived in 1936 from Romania (via France)
 Erika Fox (born 1936). Arrived in 1939 from Austria
 Hans Gál (1890-1987). Arrived 1938 from Austria
 Peter Gellhorn (1912-2014). Arrived 1935 from Germany
 Roberto Gerhard (1896-1970). Arrived 1939 from Spain (via France)
 Berthold Goldschmidt (1903-1996). Arrived 1935 from Germany
 Allan Gray (real name Josef Zmigrod, 1902-1973). Arrived 1935 from Austria
 Joseph Horovitz (1926-2022). Arrived in 1938 from Austria
 Karel Janovický (born 1930). Arrived 1950 from Czechoslovakia
 Robert Kahn (1865-1951). Arrived 1938 from Germany
 Hans May (1886-1959). Arrived 1936 from Germany (via Paris), returned to Europe 1957.
 Ernst Meyer (1905-1988). Arrived 1933 from Germany, returned 1948 
 Karl Rankl (1898-1968). Arrived 1939 from Austria
 Franz Reizenstein (1911-1968). Arrived 1934 from Germany
 Mátyás Seiber (1905-1960). Arrived 1935 from Hungary
 Leopold Spinner (1906-1980). Arrived 1939 from Austria
 Mischa Spoliansky (1898-1985). Arrived 1933 from Germany
 Egon Wellesz (1885-1974). Arrived 1938 from Austria
 Arthur Willner (1881-1959). Arrived 1938 from Austria

Other composers stayed for a short time in Britain before moving on elsewhere. They included Hanns Eisler, Ernst Krenek, Karol Rathaus, Kurt Roger, Ernst Toch and Kurt Weill

Primarily conductors or performers/teachers
 Oskar Adler (1875-1955). Arrived 1938 from Austria
 Amadeus Quartet (three members of). Arrived 1938 from Austria
 Walter Goehr (1903-1960). Arrived 1933 from Germany
 Michael Graubart (born 1930). Arrived 1938 from Austria
 Erich Gruenberg (1924-2020). Arrived 1946 from Austria (via Israel, 1938)
 Paul Hamburger (1920-2004). Arrived 1939 from Austria
 Hans Heimler (1913-1990). Arrived 1938 from Vienna
 Helene Isepp (1899-1968). Arrived 1938 from Austria
 Martin Isepp (1930-2011). Arrived 1938 from Austria
 Louis Kentner (1905-1987). Arrived 1935 from Hungary
 Anita Lasker-Wallfisch (born 1925). Arrived 1946 from Germany
 Maria Lidka (1914-2013). Arrived 1934 from Germany
 Rawicz and Landauer, piano duo. Arrived 1935 from Austria.
 Max Rostal (1905-1991). Arrived 1934 from Germany
 Rudolf Schwarz (1905-1994). Arrived from imprisonment in Germany (via Sweden) in 1947
 Jan Sedivka (1917-2009). Arrived 1942 from Czechoslovakia
 Richard Tauber (1891-1948). Left Austria 1938, British citizenship gained in March 1940.
 Vilém Tauský (1910-2004). Arrived 1940 from Czechoslovakia (via France)
 Anita Lasker-Wallfisch (born 1925). Arrived in 1946 after liberation from Belsen.
 Ilse Wolf (1921-1999). Arrived 1939 from Germany

Pianist Artur Schnabel and cellists Fritz Ball and Emanuel Feuermann stayed for a short time in Britain before moving on

Primarily critics or musicologists
 Theodor Adorno (1903-1969) arrived 1934 from Germany (with frequent trips back) but moved on to New York in 1938
 Mosco Carner (1904-1985). Arrived in 1933 from Poland
 Otto Erich Deutsch (1883-1967). Arrived in 1939, returned to Vienna 1951
 Hans Keller (1919-1985). Arrived 1938 from Austria
 Else Mayer-Lissmann (1914-1990). Arrived 1938 from Germany
 Hans Redlich (1903-1968). Arrived 1939, from Germany
 Peter Stadlen (1910-1996). Arrived 1938 from Austria
 Erwin Stein (1885-1958). Arrived 1938 from Austria
 Klaus Wachsmann (1907-1984). Arrived 1936 from Germany. Uganda (1937-57), UK (1957-63), US (1963-75), UK (1975-84)

Primarily publishers
 Adolf Aber (1893-1960). Arrived from Germany, 1933, worked at Novello
 Walter Bergmann (1902-1988). Arrived from Germany, 1939, worked at Schott
 Otto Blau (1893-1980). Arrived 1938 from Austria, worked at Josef Weinberger
 Alfred Kalmus (1889-1972). Arrived 1936 from Austria, worked at Universal Edition
 Ernst Roth (1896-1971). Arrived 1938 from Austria, worked at Boosey & Hawkes

References

Sources
 Bergfelder, Tim & Cargnelli, Christian. Destination London: German-speaking emigrés and British cinema, 1925–1950 (2008).
 Bratby, Richard. 'The musical émigrés from Nazi-Europe who shaped postwar Britain', in The Spectator, 18 February, 2023.
 Crawford: Dorothy L. A windfall of musicians: Hitler's émigrés and exiles in southern California (2009)
 Gal, Hans. Music Behind Barbed Wire: A Diary of Summer, 1940 (2014).
 Gordon, David and Peter. Musical Visitors to Britain (2005).
 Haas, Michael. Forbidden Music: The Jewish Composers Banned by the Nazis. New Haven and London: Yale University Press (2013).  (cloth);  (pbk).
 Hirschfeld, G. and others. Second Chance: Two Centuries of German-speaking Jews in the United Kingdom (1991).
 Oldfield, Sybil. The Black Book: The Britons on the Nazi Hitlist (2020).
 Snowman, Daniel, The Hitler Emigrés (2002).
 Royal College of Music. Project celebrating the work of migrant musicians who fled the Nazis.
 Royal College of Music. Singing a Song in a Foreign Land, Symposium programme, February 2014.
 Music and the Holocaust: Composers in Exile.
 Through Lotte's Lens: A film by Tony Britten.

European diaspora in the United Kingdom
Emigre
Jewish emigrants from Austria to the United Kingdom after the Anschluss